Calarcá is a municipality in the eastern part of the department of Quindío, Colombia. It is located 4 km east of the departmental capital Armenia. Its nickname is La Villa del Cacique in homage of its writers. The city was founded in 1886 by Segundo Henao during the time of colonization by people from Antioquia Department. It is the second city in Quindío with major quantity of inhabitants. In 2016 it had an estimated population of 78,779, of which 59,986 live in the main urban zone. Located along the Colombian coffee growing axis, it was made part of the "Coffee Cultural Landscape" UNESCO World Heritage Site in 2011.

History
The name derived from an indigenous chief of the Pijaos Tribe, who lived in this land. According to the legends, this chief died in a fight with an indigenous converted into the Catholicism, Baltazar Maldonado, to keep the power of the territory, in a fight placed on Peñas Blancas, a characteristic mountain of the city.

Calarcá was founded on June 29 of 1886.  The city was founded by Roman Mario Valencia and Segundo Henao, people who went from Salento making explorations through the region, in the final part of the antioqueña foundations.  In the beginning the city based its economy on mining and commerce. Years later about 30's the coffee arrived in the region and Calarcá became in one of the most important producers of the region and whole the country. The wealthy generated by the coffee, allowed the city to reach good conditions of developed and a cultural progress, which started to characterize the city as a cradle of poets, such as Luis Vidales and Bauidilio Montoya.

The city  is host of different events, such as the national festival of the coffee, among the many activities there is one called "yippao" where different Jeep's (a characteristic car of the region) are customized by their owner and go through the city, the national meeting of writers

Historic and colonial architecture is still preserved, with houses of bareque and tapia tread, which are accompanied by innumerable stories, tradition, large balconies, colorful gates, and mud roofs. Among many others, there is the Casa de los Téllez, the building of the Hospital la Misericordia, and the structure of the Rafael Uribe Uribe school.

In 1999 the city was partially destroyed for an eventually earthquake, which affected the department. This made the city lose part of the architectural heritage.

Geography 
The municipality of Calarcá is located between 4° 20’ 40” and 4° 33’ 50” north and between 75° 33’ 40” and 75° 48’ 40” west. The inner city is located 4° 33’ 0.6” north and 75° 39’ 00” west. It lies in the Andean zone flanking the Central Cordillera, east of the department of Quindío in the centre-western part of the country, within the area known as the Eje Cafetero ("Coffee Axis"). Calarcá is bordered by the municipalities of Salento to the north, Cajamarca (Tolima) to the east, Córdoba, Buenavista, Pijao in Quindío and Caicedonia in the Cauca Valley to the south, and La Tebaida y Armenia to the west.

The municipality has an area of 219.23 km². Urban area is 2.44 km². Rural area is 216.79 km². It varies in altitude between 1000 m above sea level at the confluence of the Quindío y Barragán rivers to 3667 m above sea level in the El Campanario highland area. The city itself sits at an average of 1536 m above sea level.

Economy 

Just like in others towns in the Quindio, the economy is based on Colombian coffee crops, plantain and manioc. Another important source of income is money remittance from people working in other countries to their families.

Ecotourism is also strongly supported in the area. Just outside the town is the Quindío Botanical Garden, which opened in 1985, and includes an outdoor butterfly house that contains more than 1200 species of butterflies native to Colombia, housed inside a butterfly-shaped structure of 640 m2. since the collections of medicinal plants, heliconias, and cactus, are accompanied by gardens that delight the senses.

Climbing
Peñas Blancas consists of a crag and three vertical rock faces located on the western slopes of the Central Cordillera of the Andes near Calarcá. The bright white color of the rock walls is due to the presence of calcite and limestone. There are a large number of solutional caves and rock shelters inside the cliff, but access is very difficult. The caves are believed by some local people to be the location of a legendary treasure hidden by an indigenous Pijao tribal leader, the Cacique Calarcá (from whom the nearby town derives its name), during his battle against the Spanish colonialists

The cliffs are a landmark of the region, and can be seen clearly from the nearby towns of Armenia and Calarcá. They offer opportunities for rock climbing and abseiling (rappeling) up to heights of 80 meters, as well as a 40-meter zip-line (zip-slide), ecological trails of 3.2 km and 9 km, and camping and a restaurant. From the foot of the cliffs there are fine views of Armenia, Calarca and the surrounding area.

Notable inhabitants 
Luis Vidales (1904–1990) Poet and writer
Baudilio Montoya Poet 
Francisco Noe Torres Rincon Artist
Octavio Guzmán Bahen Physicist
Noel Estrada Roldan Poet 
Fabio Botero Cartoonist
Hernando Jiménez Sánchez Artist 
Olga Lucia Roldan Artist 
Gloria Cecilia Díaz Writer 
Jaime Lopera Gutierrez Writer 
Lucelly García de Montoya Politician
Jairo Ramon Pelaez Cartoonist
Jairo Alvarez Osorio Cartoonist
Jairo Ramon Pelaez Cartoonist
Carlos A. Villegas U.o Writer
Laura del Sol Jiménez, Flutist
Luisa Fernanda Gonzalez, Nurse

External links 
Official web page of the city council (in Spanish) 
Quindío Botanical Garden (in Spanish)

References 
Lopera Gutiérrez, Jaime, La Colonización del Quindío.

Loaiza Piedrahita, Oscar (2004), Los corredores del tiempo: Guía turística por la historia del Quindío.  .  Book in Spanish on the history of the municipalities of Quindío until the foundation of the department in 1966.  The local history is placed in the context of wider events in Colombia.

References

1985 establishments in Colombia
Buildings and structures in Quindío Department
Butterfly houses
Climbing areas of Colombia
Landmarks in Colombia
Municipalities of Quindío Department
Tourist attractions in Quindío Department